Channel World is owned and published by IDG and covers the sales channel. The magazine is published monthly. It is published in local versions in Belgium, Czech Republic, India (since 2007)  and Netherlands (made from a merger of Channel Partner and Retail Partner in 2007).

References

External links
 Indian edition website

Monthly magazines published in the United Kingdom
Defunct computer magazines published in the United Kingdom
Magazines with year of establishment missing
Computer magazines published in India
Magazines disestablished in 2015